Roanoke Colony was an enterprise financed and organized by Sir Walter Raleigh in the late 16th century to establish a permanent English settlement in the Virginia Colony.

1585 colony

The original colony was established in 1585 as a military outpost under the command of Ralph Lane, and evacuated in 1586.  A list of colonists is provided in Richard Hakluyt's The Principal Navigations, Voyages, Traffiques, And Discoveries Of The English Nation, although no author is recorded for the list.  The list denotes 107 men who served under Lane, for a total of 108 colonists.

A point of contention among historians is that John White is not listed among the 1585 colonists. White is known to have arrived at Roanoke with the colonists, but there is no record of him remaining with the colony through the winter or returning to England with Richard Grenville's fleet. David Beers Quinn argued that White must have remained in the colony long enough to produce a map based on the colonists' 1586 exploration of the region.  He speculated that a simple error could have omitted White from the list, or included him as "Iohn Twyt", "William White", or "Iohn Wright". In contrast, James Horn observed that White produced no known artwork of the people and towns discovered after August 1585, suggesting he was no longer present in the colony. As for the map, Horn argued that White, who was not a surveyor, would have based his illustration on someone else's survey data, making it no less plausible that he received such data in England than at Roanoke. In any event, the dispute raises the possibility of errors in the list Hakluyt published, and that the figure of 108 may not be exact.

1587 colony

Following the evacuation of the 1585 Roanoke colony, Walter Raleigh commissioned a second colony to be established by John White in 1587.  The second colony was intended to settle in Chesapeake Bay, but instead was deposited on Roanoke Island.  The colonists requested that White return to England, with the expectation that he would come back to Roanoke with fresh supplies in 1588.  When White finally returned in 1590, the site of the colony was abandoned.

The exact number of people in the "Lost Colony" is disputed.  Hakluyt's Principal Navigations provides a list of 119 individuals who "safely arrived in Virginia" and remained there as of August 1587.  The list is not credited, but was presumably compiled by White, given his unique familiarity with the matter.  However, White himself is included in the list, as well as Simon Fernandes (who also returned to England) and two men who had died prior to White's departure.  The name "Thomas Harris" appears twice, possibly representing two men with the same name or an unintentional duplication.  These problems suggest the possibility of other, less obvious issues in the list.

In a 1955 analysis of the list, David Beers Quinn determined "therefore, eighty-five men, less one dead (George Howe) and two returned (John White and Simon Fernandez), seventeen women and eleven children, making 113 brought from England and 110 left by White, plus two children born on Roanoke Island and two Indians, the total left behind being 114."  However, Quinn's count of 85 European men may be in error, as he presents all 91 names from Hakluyt but only deducts three.    A very conservative tabulation (discounting White, Fernandes, Howe, Thomas Smith and the second Thomas Harris, and assuming Manteo and Towaye did not reside with the colony) would yield a population of 112 following White's departure.  In contrast, Andy Gabriel-Powell proposed that the Hakluyt list may be incomplete, and that the total could be as high as 121.

Men

Women

Children

Children born at the colony

Native American repatriates

See also
English colonial empire
List of people who disappeared

Notes

References

1590s missing person cases
English colonization of the Americas
History of the Thirteen Colonies
 
Pre-statehood history of North Carolina
Roanoke
Lists of 16th-century people